Eoghan Cross is an Irish rugby referee. He is a member of Ireland's referee High Performance Panel.

Career

Cross, born in Limerick, has been refereeing since 2016, being named Munster Rugby Referee of the year in 2020. He had previously officiated matches during the 2022 Six Nations Under 20s Championship.

References

Living people
Irish rugby union referees
People from Limerick (city)
United Rugby Championship referees
Year of birth missing (living people)